The 1991–92 Japan Ice Hockey League season was the 26th season of the Japan Ice Hockey League. Six teams participated in the league, and Kokudo Ice Hockey Club won the championship.

Regular season

Final
 Oji Seishi Hockey - Kokudo Ice Hockey Club 1:3 (5:7, 2:3, 3:2, 1:2)

External links
 Japan Ice Hockey Federation

Japan
Ice Hock
Japan Ice Hockey League seasons
Japan